Michael Oblowitz is a South African filmmaker.

Early life and education
Oblowitz was born in Cape Town where he grew up surfing in the 1970s. He is a Fine Arts and Philosophy graduate of the University of Cape Town. He received an M.F.A. in Film Theory and Production from Columbia University in 1982 and studied color photography and printing at the Central School of Art London in 1976.

Career
He began his career in the early 1970s with the films X-Terminator, The Is/Land, Minus Zero and King Blank. The films are part of the permanent collection of the Museum of Modern Art in New York City. 

He entered the mainstream in 1997 with the crime drama film This World, Then the Fireworks. In October 2010, his film The Traveller, starring Val Kilmer, was released in the United States. It won an award for Best Thriller Feature at the 2011 New York International Independent Film & Video Festival.

He released his first surfing documentary, Sea Of Darkness in 2010. The documentary won the Best Feature award at the New York Surf Film Festival.  His second surfing documentary, Heavy Water, which was released in 2017 starred Nathan Fletcher, won Best surfing film at the Byron Bay International Film Festival and won Best Wavescape film at the 2018 Durban International Film Festival. In 2018, he directed the film Frank & Ava. 

He has also produced music videos for musicians such as of David Bowie and Diana Ross.

Notable films 
X-Terminator-1977
The Is/Land-Circuits of Control (with David Goldberg, 1978)
Minus Zero-1979
King Blank (1982)
This World, Then the Fireworks (1997)
Sea of Darkness (Documentary, 2010)
The Traveler (2010)
The Ganzfeld Experiment (2013)
Heavy Water (2017)
Frank & Ava (2018)

Music videos 
"Basketball" by Kurtis Blow (1983)
"Hippy Land Rap" by Tommy Chong 1990 
"The Healer" by John Lee Hooker and Carlos Santana (1993)
"Mustang Sally" by Buddy Guy and Jeff Beck (1994)
Booker T and the M.G's Live in Laguna (music documentary, 1995)
Buddy Guy - Live: The Real Deal (music documentary, 1996)
"Standing Here" by the Stone Roses (1997)

Selected filmography
1977 X-terminator, (short film)
1977 Table Conversation, (Short Film)
1979 Minus Zero
1979 Death Magazine
1979 Red Love Color
1980 Too Sensitive to Touch
1998 The Areola (co-directed)
2001 The Breed
2003 Out for a Kill
2003 The Foreigner
2005 Hammerhead: Shark Frenzy
2008 Romantic Resorts
2016 Untitled Sunny Garcia Documentary (in production)

Awards and recognitions

References

External links
 

South African film directors
Living people
University of Cape Town alumni
Columbia University School of the Arts alumni
South African music video directors
1952 births